Glyphipterix circumscriptella is a species of sedge moth in the genus Glyphipterix. It was described by Vactor Tousey Chambers in 1881. It is found in North America, including Illinois, Kentucky, New York, Quebec, Texas and Wisconsin.

References

Moths described in 1881
Glyphipterigidae
Moths of North America